Fay Island is a small, partially submerged island in the San Joaquin River delta, in California. It is part of San Joaquin County, and managed by Reclamation District 2113. It appears, almost completely submerged, on a 1952 United States Geological Survey map of the area.

References

Islands of San Joaquin County, California
Islands of the Sacramento–San Joaquin River Delta
Islands of Northern California